Orpheus Saeger Woodward (May 1, 1835 – June 26, 1919) was a Union Army officer during American Civil War. 

Woodward was born in Harbor Creek, Pennsylvania, May 1, 1835. He was a farmer and hardware merchant before the Civil War. He started his Civil War service as a private in the Erie Pennsylvania Infantry. On September 13, 1861, he was appointed captain of the 83rd Pennsylvania Infantry Regiment.  

Woodward was wounded at Battle of Malvern Hill. He was promoted to colonel of the 83rd Pennsylvania Infantry Regiment on March 28, 1864. He served in the Antietam Campaign and fought at the Battle of Chancellorsville and at Little Round Top during the Battle of Gettysburg. Woodward was severely wounded at the Battle of the Wilderness on May 5, 1864 which resulted in his right leg being amputated.  He was mustered out of the volunteers on September 20, 1864.

On February 24, 1866, President Andrew Johnson nominated Woodward for appointment to the grade of brevet brigadier general of volunteers, to rank from March 13, 1865, and the United States Senate confirmed the appointment on April 10, 1866.

Orpheus Saeger Woodward died at Leavenworth, Kansas, June 26, 1919.  He was buried at Cedar Vale Cemetery, Neosho Falls, Kansas.

See also

List of American Civil War brevet generals (Union)

References

1837 births
1919 deaths
People from Erie County, Pennsylvania
People of Pennsylvania in the American Civil War
Union Army colonels